The Superleague Formula round Spain is a round of the Superleague Formula. After hosting events at Circuito de Jerez in 2008 and Circuito del Jarama in 2009, Spain will be hosting two rounds during 2010, the first again to Circuito del Jarama and the second at the newly opened Circuito de Navarra in Los Arcos.

Winners

References

External links
 Superleague Formula Official Website
 V12 Racing: Independent Superleague Formula Fansite Magazine

Spain